The sogeum (also spelled sogum or sogŭm) is a small bamboo transverse flute used in traditional Korean music.  Unlike the larger daegeum, it does not have a buzzing membrane (although it did have one in ancient times). It is used in court, aristocratic, and folk music, as well as in contemporary classical music, popular music, and film scores.

The overall length and thickness are not constant because sogeum is made of natural bamboo, but it is 40cm long and 2.2cm thick.

Other larger flutes in the same family include the medium-sized junggeum and the large daegeum; the three together are known as samjuk (hangul: 삼죽; hanja: 三竹; literally "three bamboo"), as the three primary flutes of the Silla period.

The sogeum has the highest and clearest tone among wind instruments, and is often composed of singular numbers in ensemble, where other wind instruments are composed of multiple instruments.

How to play 
Sogeum is played in the same way as playing the Daegeum. There is a weak point that the instrument can not be used freely because of its short length, and it is difficult to transpose. Sogeum can theoretically sound all twelve notes, but actually only eight notes are played naturally, and the rest of the notes do not sound due to various restrictions on the play. Sogeum plays a role of making the songs that require high tone and clear tone in the main music, and it is rarely used as a solo instrument.

See also
Bamboo musical instruments
Daegeum
Junggeum
Music of Korea
Traditional Korean musical instruments

References

External links
Sogeum page

Side-blown flutes
Korean musical instruments
Bamboo flutes